Kissos FC Kissonergas is a Cypriot football club based in Kissonerga of the Paphos District.

History 
The club was founded in 2007 after the merger of two clubs: Kissos Kissonergas and AEM Mesogis. The team played 3 times in Cypriot Third Division and 4 times in Cypriot Fourth Division The club refounden then again in 2015 and is since then playing in the POASP division of smaller football teams in Paphos.

Defunct football clubs in Cyprus
Association football clubs established in 2007
2007 establishments in Cyprus